Robert John "Golden Boy" Goldham (May 12, 1922 – September 6, 1991) was a Canadian ice hockey defenceman and broadcaster. He played two seasons for the Toronto Marlboros earning the name "Golden Boy". He was later called the "Second Goalie" because his fearless skills blocking the puck.

Playing career
Goldham started his National Hockey League career with the Toronto Maple Leafs in 1941 after playing for the Hershey Bears in the AHL. He would return to the AHL after the 1942 Stanley Cup win to play on the AHL 2nd All–Star Team.

Goldham served in the Royal Canadian Navy from 1942 through 1945.  After the Second World War he returned to the Toronto Maple Leafs until 1947 when he was traded with four other Leafs to the Chicago Black Hawks for Max Bentley and Cy Thomas.

In 1950, Goldham was traded to the Detroit Red Wings earning their Assistant Captain position in 1952 and would retire after the 1956 season. In 1955, he was a member of the NHL 2nd All-Star Team and won five Stanley Cups in his career in 1942, and 1947 with Toronto and 1952, 1954, and 1955 with Detroit.

Goldham played in the following NHL All-Star Games: 1942, 2nd All Star Team AHL. NHL 1947, 1949, 1950, 1952, 1954 and 2nd All Star Team 1955.

Goldham coached the Toronto St. Michael's Majors during the 1959–60 season, then resigned and was succeeded by Father David Bauer.

Post-playing Career
After retiring, he worked for several years as a TV color commentator/studio analyst on Hockey Night in Canada on CBC and on the local midweek Toronto Maple Leaf broadcasts on Hamilton's CHCH-TV channel 11. Goldham was known as the First Little NHLer founded by Gordon Alcott in 1936, to make the NHL.

Goldham was married to Eleanor, and they had three daughters: Patricia, Susan and Barbara.

In 2015, he was posthumously inducted into the Canada's Sports Hall of Fame.

Career statistics

References

External links

Bob Goldham's obituary on The New York Times

1922 births
1991 deaths
Canadian military personnel from Ontario
Canadian ice hockey coaches
Canadian ice hockey defencemen
Chicago Blackhawks players
Detroit Red Wings players
Hershey Bears players
Ice hockey people from Ontario
National Hockey League broadcasters
People from Halton Hills
Pittsburgh Hornets players
Stanley Cup champions
Toronto Maple Leafs announcers
Toronto Maple Leafs players
Toronto Marlboros players
Toronto St. Michael's Majors coaches
Washington Lions players
Royal Canadian Navy personnel of World War II